Improved Orion is the designation of an American sounding rocket. It has a maximum flight altitude of 85 km, a liftoff thrust of 7.00 kN, a total mass of 400 kg, a core diameter of 0.35 m and a total length of 5.60 m.

See also
 Terrier Orion

External links
 Detailed information

Sounding rockets of the United States